The following is a list of pine trees in Romania:

Pinus abies (ssp. vulgaris)
Pinus banksiana
Pinus cembra
Pinus mugo
Pinus nigra
Pinus pinea
Pinus sylvestris

See also
Pines of Denmark
List of pines by region

References

Flora of Romania
Romania
Lists of trees